Mr Lockwood is the frame-narrator in Emily Brontë's 1847 novel Wuthering Heights, and the recorder of the main narrative, which is related to him by Nelly Dean.

Lockwood is an English gentleman who arrives on the Yorkshire moors for a retreat from city life. The narrative is propelled by Lockwood's interest in Heathcliff, his landlord at Thrushcross Grange.

Narrative 
Wuthering Heights begins as Lockwood arrives at Thrushcross Grange, an estate in the moorland that he is renting from Heathcliff. Heathcliff, at the time Lockwood arrives, owns both Wuthering Heights and Thrushcross Grange, two neighbouring estates. Early in the book, Lockwood visits Wuthering Heights, where he is shocked by the behaviour of Heathcliff and the other residents of the manor. 

Lockwood nevertheless pays a second visit to Wuthering Heights, when, due to the weather, he is forced to spend the night. Without proper lodgings available, Lockwood is taken to a small room by a servant, who instructs Lockwood to not let Heathcliff know that he is there. During the night, Lockwood reads a book wherein he finds the names "Catherine Earnshaw" and "Catherine Linton" written repeatedly. In the course of the night, Lockwood sees a spectre of Catherine; he relates,

Upon waking, Lockwood recounts the vision to Heathcliff, who orders Lockwood to leave Wuthering Heights. Before he leaves, Lockwood observes Heathcliff enter the bedroom and attempt to speak to the ghost of Catherine: "Come in! come in!" he sobbed.  "Cathy, do come.  Oh, do — once more!  Oh! my heart's darling! hear me this time, Catherine, at last!"

Upon returning to Thrushcross Grange, Lockwood inquires about the history of Heathcliff and Wuthering Heights with Nelly Dean. While Lockwood is bedridden with an illness, Nelly recounts to him the story of Heathcliff, the Earnshaws of Wuthering Heights, and the Lintons of Thrushcross Grange.  Nelly's retelling makes up the bulk of the novel. 

The novel concludes as Lockwood returns to Wuthering Heights to notify Heathcliff that he wished to terminate his lease of Thrushcross Grange. Upon arriving at the Heights, Lockwood discovers that Heathcliff had died, and that Heathcliff's niece, Cathy, and nephew, Hareton, are to be married. Lockwood, upon seeing them together, feels regretful that he missed a possible chance at romance with Cathy.

The final scene of Wuthering Heights shows Lockwood passing by the graves of Heathcliff, Catherine, and Edgar Linton at the local kirkyard and commenting on the tranquility of the scene.

References 
Brontë, Emily: Wuthering Heights (Oxford World's Classics, 1998).

Notes 

Characters in Wuthering Heights